Dangcagan, officially the Municipality of Dangcagan, is a 3rd class municipality in the province of Bukidnon, Philippines. According to the 2020 census, it has a population of 26,076 people.

History

Dangcagan used to be an abode of the Manobos under the leadership of Datu Dangaan (meaning “to praise”), a prominent chieftain ruler known for his courage and affluence. The place was then a little Sitio of Maramag. As the Christian settlers from Luzon & Visayas began to flock and settle in the area, Datu Dangaan followers ran and hid their families in the forest and returned to their home only when they knew the settlers were not around.

This leads the settler to call the “Dagandagan”. It took ample time for the settler to befriend the natives. When the natives and the Christian settlers finally united, they made representation to the Municipal Government of Maramag to form a regular barrio within the territory of Datu Dangaan. They agreed to call the barrio Dangcagan in honor of the natives.

The first set of officers was headed by Mayor Vicente Cabiling, originally appointed to the position in 1961 and was elected and served for ten (10) consecutive years, he constructed the old Municipal Hall on top of the hill in the poblacion. And from 1972 until March 1986 Mayor Fruto Ll. Dandasan assumed the office. During his time he constructed new roads and maintained the barangay road network of Dangcagan

In 1992, Mayor Norberta B. Dandasan assumed as Municipal Mayor until June 1995. She pursued the programs and projects that were initiated by her late husband and other predecessors. The municipal gymnasium was completed.

In the May 1995 election,  Roberto Cabunoc took over the mayorship of the town and implemented the road concreting projects, beautification of the municipal plaza, installation of water system, construction of the new municipal hall and completion of different barangay projects. After three terms of Mayor Cabunoc, Mayor Edilberto F. Ayuban followed with 3 consecutive terms.

In the mayoral election of 2013, Mayor Fruto B.  Dandasan who used to be one of the town's elected councilor, became the town vice mayor for two consecutive terms and now elected as the municipal mayor of the town.

Geography

Dangcagan is located in the southern part of the province. The town is sandwiched by municipality of Kitaotao in the northern and eastern part, by Kibawe, in its southern part and by Kadingilan on its western part. The Pulangi River and Muleta River serves as its natural boundary with Kitaotao (eastern side) and Kadingilan (western side), respectively.

The municipality has an aggregate land area of more or less .

Climate
It has distinct dry and wet season; the wettest Month is usually September and the driest month is March.

Soil and topography
It has a fertile soil ranging from clay to sandy loam. Its topography is 70% flat and 30% rolling, which is suitable for agricultural crops such as corn, rice and other commercial crops like coconut, coffee, cacao, rubber, banana and sugar cane.

Barangays

Dangcagan is politically subdivided into 14 barangays.

Demographics

Languages and dialects
The majority of the municipality's inhabitants speak Cebuano, although some inhabitants also speak the Hiligaynon/Ilonggo language and many still speak Binukid (Manobo language).

Economy

References

External links
 [ Philippine Standard Geographic Code]
Philippine Census Information

Municipalities of Bukidnon
Populated places on the Rio Grande de Mindanao